Sint-Martens-Latem is a municipality located in the Belgian province of East Flanders, in Belgium. The municipality comprises the towns of Deurle and Sint-Martens-Latem proper. In 2021, Sint-Martens-Latem had a total population of 8,285. The total area is 14.34 km².

While "Latem" used to be known as an artists' colony before World War II, nowadays Sint-Martens-Latem is one of the wealthiest residential municipalities in Belgium.

Notable people

Luc-Peter Crombé, painter
Gustave De Smet, painter
George Minne, sculptor and artist
Constant Permeke, painter
Gustave Van de Woestijne, painter
Rudolf Werthen, violinist & conductor

Gallery

References

External links

 

 
Municipalities of East Flanders
Populated places in East Flanders